Fernandina Island (Spanish: Isla Fernandina, named after Ferdinand II of Aragon, the sponsor of Christopher Columbus) (formerly known in English as Narborough Island, after John Narborough) is the third largest, and youngest, island of the Galápagos Islands, as well as the furthest west. Like the others, the island was formed by the Galápagos hotspot. The island is an active shield volcano that has most recently been erupting since April 11, 2009.

On February 14, 1825, while anchored in Banks Bay, Captain Benjamin Morrell recorded one of the largest eruptions in Galápagos' history at Fernandina Volcano. His ship escaped to safety and his account of the event was preserved.

The caldera underwent a collapse in 1968, when parts of the caldera floor dropped . A small lake has intermittently occupied the northern caldera floor, most recently in 1988.

Due to its recent volcanic activity, the island does not present much plant life and has a mostly rocky surface. Visitors to Fernandina Island will be taken to see only the outskirts of the crater for safety reasons. Two types of lava flow can be observed, ʻaʻā and pāhoehoe.

Flora and fauna
Punta Espinoza is a narrow stretch of land where hundreds of marine iguanas gather in large groups on black lava rocks. The famous flightless cormorant inhabits this island as well as penguins, pelicans and sea lions. The Narborough Island tortoise is a highly elusive species of Galápagos tortoise restricted to the island, thought likely extinct when no sighting had been made for 113 years after 1906, one old female being found in 2019.

Mangrove forests are also found on the island.

April 2009 Eruption
The southern flank of the volcano La Cumbre had a fissure eruption that generated flows, which subsided within hours. Isla Fernandina supports wildlife that was threatened by the April 2009 burst of volcanic activity, according to rangers at Galápagos National Park. As the island has no human residents, no settlements were endangered. Park rangers and a passing tourist boat initially observed the volcano at 10:00 p.m. local time on April 10, 2009. A sparse human population in the western reaches of the Galápagos Islands means that volcanic activity is not always observed or reported as soon as it starts. The seismic station at Puerto Ayora, on the nearby island of Santa Cruz, recorded no earthquakes associated with this eruption.

See also
Volcanoes of the Galápagos Islands
List of volcanoes in Ecuador

References

External links
Special Report: Volcano Erupts on Fernandina Island. Charles Darwin Foundation
Fernandina
Benjamin Morell and the Galápagos Eruption of 1825 
Eruption on Isla Fernandina NASA Earth Observatory

Islands of the Galápagos Islands
Mountains of Ecuador
Polygenetic shield volcanoes
Volcanoes of Ecuador
Active volcanoes
Calderas
Hotspot volcanoes
Uninhabited islands of Ecuador